Phasmasaurus is a genus of skinks. Both species are endemic to New Caledonia.

Species
The following 2 species, listed alphabetically by specific name, are recognized as being valid:

Phasmasaurus maruia (Sadlier, Whitaker & Bauer, 1998) - Maruia Maquis skink
Phasmasaurus tillieri (Ineich & Sadlier, 1991)  - Tiller's Maquis skink

Nota bene: A binomial authority in parentheses indicates that the species was originally described in a genus other than Phasmasaurus.

References

 
Lizard genera
Endemic fauna of New Caledonia
Taxa named by Ross Allen Sadlier
Taxa named by Aaron M. Bauer
Taxa named by Glenn Michael Shea
Taxa named by Sarah A. Smith